Bug Music is an album by clarinetist Don Byron featuring music from the 1930s, specifically Duke Ellington, Billy Strayhorn, John Kirby, and Raymond Scott. It was released on the Nonesuch label in 1996.

Reception
The Allmusic review by Scott Yanow stated "Other than a silly rendition of Ellington's 'Blue Bubbles' and an adventurous interpretation of 'Snibor,' the selections are played with respect and great understanding of the somewhat forgotten style. None of the modern musicians sound as if swing were only their second language, making the continually surprising set a major success." The album peaked at #4 on the Billboard jazz charts in February 1997.

Track listing
All music transcribed and arranged by Don Byron.

 "The Dicty Glide" (Duke Ellington) – 3:15
 "Frasquita Serenade" (F. Lehar, H. Reichert, A.M. Willner) – 2:50
 "St. Louis Blues" (William C. Handy) - 2:52
 "Wondering Where" (Charles Shavers) - 2:50
 "Bounce of the Sugar Plum Fairies" (Tchaikovsky, Louis C. Singer) - 1:39
 "Charley's Prelude" (Louis C. Singer) - 2:47
 "Royal Garden Blues" (Clarence Williams, Spencer Williams) - 1:50
 "Siberian Sleighride" (Raymond Scott) - 2:50
 "The Penguin" (Raymond Scott) - 2:47
 "The Quintet Plays Carmen" (Raymond Scott) - 2:51
 "Powerhouse" (Raymond Scott) - 2:54
 "Tobacco Auctioneer" (Raymond Scott) - 2:35
 "War Dance for Wooden Indians" (Raymond Scott) - 2:32
 "Cotton Club Stomp" (Duke Ellington, Harry Carney, Johnny Hodges) - 2:45
 "Blue Bubbles" (Duke Ellington) - 3:24
 "SNIBOR" (Billy Strayhorn) - 9:48

Personnel
Don Byron – clarinet, baritone saxophone, conductor
Steve Wilson - alto saxophone
Robert DeBellis - tenor saxophone
Charles Lewis - trumpet
Steven Bernstein - trumpet
James Zollar - trumpet
Craig Harris - trombone
Uri Caine - piano, vocals
Paul Meyers - banjo
David Gilmore - guitar
Kenny Davis - bass
Pheeroan akLaff - drums
Billy Hart - drums
Joey Baron - drums
Dean Bowman - vocals

References 

Don Byron albums
1996 albums
Nonesuch Records albums
Jazz albums by American artists